My Tra Thai is an American computer science engineer, professor in the Computer and Information Science and Engineering department at the University of Florida, and Fellow of the IEEE.

Early life and education
Thai completed two bachelor's degrees in computer science and mathematics from Iowa State University in 1999 before enrolling at the University of Minnesota for her PhD.

Career
Upon completing her PhD, Thai joined the University of Florida as an assistant professor and received a Young Investigator Award from the Defense Threat Reduction Agency for her project "C-WMD: Models, Complexity, and Algorithms in Complex Dynamic and Evolving Networks." She also received a National Science Foundation CAREER Awards from 2010 to 2015 for her project "Optimization Models and Approximation Algorithms for Network Vulnerability and Adaptability." In 2015, Thai became the first woman to be named a Full professor in the Computer and Information Science and Engineering department at the University of Florida. The following year, she was named a University of Florida Research Foundation Professor from 2016 to 2019.

In 2019, Thai was appointed the Associate Director of The Warren B. Nelms Institute for the Connected World. During the COVID-19 pandemic, Thai was elected a Fellow of the Institute of Electrical and Electronics Engineers for her "contributions to modeling, design, and optimization of networked systems."

References

External links

Living people
University of Minnesota alumni
Iowa State University alumni
University of Florida faculty
Fellow Members of the IEEE
American women computer scientists
American computer scientists
Year of birth missing (living people)
21st-century American women